Adriana Sarur Torre (born 17 June 1974) is a Mexican politician from the Ecologist Green Party of Mexico. From 2009 to 2012 she served as Deputy of the LXI Legislature of the Mexican Congress representing Veracruz. And from 2012 to 2015 served as Deputy of the LXIII legislature . Actually she is columnist of the El Heraldo, also is TV host and analyst at ADN40 channel with programs “Desde las Camaras” and “La encerrona”.  Director of government relationship of Salinas Group.

References

1974 births
Living people
Politicians from Veracruz
Women members of the Chamber of Deputies (Mexico)
Ecologist Green Party of Mexico politicians
21st-century Mexican politicians
21st-century Mexican women politicians
Deputies of the LXI Legislature of Mexico
Members of the Chamber of Deputies (Mexico) for Veracruz